Gregory I served as Greek Patriarch of Alexandria between 1243 and 1263.

References

13th-century Patriarchs of Alexandria